Dahi vada is a type of chaat (snack) originating from the Indian state of Maharashtra. It is prepared by soaking vadas (fried lentil balls) in thick dahi (yogurt).

Names
Dahi vada is also known as "dahi vade" in Marathi, dahi barey/dahi balley in Urdu, dahi vada in Hindi, dahi bhalla in Punjabi, thayir vadai in Tamil, thairu vada in Malayalam, perugu vada in Telugu, mosaru vade in Kannada, dahi bara (ଦହି ବରା) in Odia and doi bora (দই বড়া) in Bengali.

History

A recipe for dahi wada (as kshiravata) is mentioned in Manasollasa, a 12th-century Sanskrit encyclopedia compiled by Someshvara III, who ruled from present-day Karnataka. Descriptions of dahi vada also appear in literature from 500 BCE. Today, dahi vada is prepared on festival such as Holi.

Preparation
Washed urad lentils are soaked overnight and ground into a batter for the vada, then cooked in hot oil. The hot deep-fried vadas are first put in water and then transferred to thick beaten yogurt. The vadas are soaked for a period of time before serving. Additions to the batter may include golden raisins. Vadas may be topped with coriander or mint leaves, chilli powder, crushed black pepper, chaat masala, cumin, shredded coconut, green chilies, boondi, thinly sliced fresh ginger, or pomegranate. Sweeter curd is preferred in some places in India, especially in Maharashtra and Gujarat, although the garnishing remains the same. A combination of coriander and tamarind chutney is often used as a garnish. The batter can be made using chickpea flour too.

Locations 
Dahi vada as popular street chaat is found in various cities across India, including Chennai, Bangalore, Delhi, Mumbai, Jaipur, Kolkata, Cuttack, and Indore. Dahi vadas are also found in Pakistan, especially in regions of Punjab and in major cities.

See also
 Dahi puri
 Dahibara Aludam
 Joshpara
 Punjabi cuisine

References

Indian fast food
Pakistani cuisine
Bengali cuisine
Tamil cuisine
Telangana cuisine
Odia cuisine
Bihari cuisine
Yogurt-based dishes
Indian cuisine